Éva Csernoviczki (born 16 October 1986 in Tatabánya) is a Hungarian judoka. She became the first Hungarian woman to win an Olympic medal in judo, after getting the bronze in the Woman's Judo 48 kg in the 2012 Summer Olympics. She also competed in the women's 48 kg event at the 2016 Summer Olympics, where she was eliminated by Galbadrakh Otgontsetseg in the repechage.

Csernoviczki also earned a bronze medal at the 2011 World Judo Championships, and has silver medals from three consecutive European Judo Championships.

In 2021, she represented Hungary at the 2020 Summer Olympics in Tokyo, Japan. She competed in the women's 48 kg event.

Her father, Csaba Csernoviczki, coaches the female Hungarian judo team.

References

External links
 
 
 
 

1986 births
Judoka at the 2008 Summer Olympics
Judoka at the 2012 Summer Olympics
Judoka at the 2016 Summer Olympics
Judoka at the 2020 Summer Olympics
Olympic bronze medalists for Hungary
Olympic judoka of Hungary
Olympic medalists in judo
People from Tatabánya
Hungarian female judoka
Living people
Medalists at the 2012 Summer Olympics
European Games bronze medalists for Hungary
European Games medalists in judo
Judoka at the 2015 European Games
Universiade medalists in judo
Universiade bronze medalists for Hungary
Judoka at the 2019 European Games
Sportspeople from Komárom-Esztergom County
21st-century Hungarian women